This is a list of steel manufacturers in Uganda:

 Roofing Rolling Mills Limited - Namanve Industrial Park, Kira Municipality, Wakiso District
 Roofings Limited - Lubowa, Wakiso District
 IBM Steel Building Material Suppliers - Kampala - Kampala District - Kampala - Uganda
 IBM Steel Metal Material Suppliers - Kampala - Kampala District - Kampala - Uganda
 Yogi Steels Limited - Njeru - Buikwe District - Jinja - Uganda
 Mayuge Sugar Industries Ltd – Steel Division - Buikwe District - Jinja - Uganda
 Pramukh Steel Limited - Njeru - Buikwe District - Jinja - Uganda
 Steel Rolling Mills Uganda Limited - Member of the Alam Group - Jinja, Jinja District
 Steel and Tube Industries Uganda Limited - Kampala
 Tembo Steel Mills (Uganda) Limited - Jinja, Jinja District 
 Uganda Baati Limited - Kampala, Tororo & Arua
 MM Integrated Steel Mills (Uganda) Limited - Jinja, Jinja District
 China Machine Building International Corporation Mbarara, Mbarara District
Madhvani group limited steel division

See also
 History of the steel industry (1970–present)
 List of steel producers

References

Uganda
Steel
Industry in Uganda